Code page 852 (CCSID 852) (also known as CP 852, IBM 00852, OEM 852 (Latin II), MS-DOS Latin 2) is a code page used under DOS to write Central European languages that use Latin script (such as Bosnian, Croatian, Czech, Hungarian, Polish, Romanian, Serbian, Slovak or Slovene).

CCSID 9044 is the euro currency update of code page/CCSID 852. Byte AA replaces ¬ with € in that update.

Note that code page 852 (DOS Latin 2) is very different from ISO/IEC 8859-2 (ISO Latin-2), although both are informally referred to as "Latin-2" in different language regions. However, all printable characters from ISO 8859-2 are included, in a different arrangement which preserves a subset of the box-drawing characters of the original DOS code page 437, while sacrificing others (those combining both single and double lining) in order to include more letters with diacritics. This is the same approach taken by code page 850, the equivalent for ISO 8859-1.

This reduced box-drawing support caused display glitches in DOS applications that made use of the box-drawing characters to display a GUI-like surface in text mode (e.g. Norton Commander). Several local, more language-specific encodings were invented to avoid the problem, for example the Kamenický encoding for Czech and Slovak or the Mazovia encoding for Polish.

Character set 
The following table shows code page 852. Each character is shown with its equivalent Unicode code point. Only the second half of the table (128–255) is shown, the first half (0–127) being the same as code page 437.

See also 
LMBCS-6

References 

852